The 1952–53 Yugoslav Ice Hockey League season was the 11th season of the Yugoslav Ice Hockey League, the top level of ice hockey in Yugoslavia. 11 teams participated in the league, and Partizan have won the championship.

Standings

Partizan
Zagreb
Mladost
Ljubljana
Jesenice
Spartak Subotica
Kladivar Celje
Segesta Sisak
Vevče
Partizan Brežice
BSK Belgrade

References

External links
Yugoslav Ice Hockey League seasons

Yugo
Yugoslav Ice Hockey League seasons
1952–53 in Yugoslav ice hockey